Aberdeen F.C. competed in the Scottish Premier Division, Scottish Cup, League Cup and UEFA Cup in season 1979–80. They finished first in the Premier Division, the club's first Premier Division title and second Scottish league championship. In the cups, they reached the Scottish Cup Semi final, losing to Rangers, and lost the League Cup Final after a replay against Dundee United. In Europe, they were drawn against Eintracht Frankfurt, losing 1–2 on aggregate over two legs in the first round.

Results

Friendlies

In July 1979, Aberdeen embarked on a tour of Denmark, playing three games. This was followed by friendly matches against three Scottish clubs, and home games against English clubs Coventry City and Tottenham Hotspur. During the season, friendly matches were played against Leicester City, Rothes and an Arbroath Select.

Scottish Premier Division

Final standings

Results by round

Drybrough Cup

Scottish League Cup

Scottish Cup

UEFA Cup

Squad

Appearances & Goals

|}

References

Aberdeen F.C. seasons
Aberdeen
Scottish football championship-winning seasons